Omsk State Pedagogical University is a university in Omsk, Russia.

History
Omsk State Pedagogical University was founded by decree No. 298 of the Council of People's Commissars of the RSFSR on March 25, 1932, as Omsk Pedagogical Institute. Initially the institute consisted of three faculties: Philological, Physics and Mathematics, and Biology and Chemistry. The first intake—120 students. The first graduation—79 specialists.

Organization and administration

Structure

Faculties 
 Faculty of Philology
 Faculty of History, Philosophy and Law
 Faculty of Foreign Languages
 Faculty of Mathematics, Computer Science, Physics and Technology
 Faculty of Elementary, Preschool and Special Education
 Faculty of Psychology and Pedagogy
 Faculty of Economics, Management, Service and Tourism
 Faculty of Science Education
 Faculty of Arts
 Center for Master's Studies

Branches 
 Omsk State Pedagogical University branch in Tara

Campus

Notable people

Alumni 
 Aleksandr Gorban
 Yegor Letov
 Sergey Letov
 Oleg Smolin
 Anatoly Konenko

References

External links
 Official website

Omsk
Universities in Omsk Oblast
Teachers colleges in Russia
1932 establishments in Russia
Educational institutions established in 1932
Universities and institutes established in the Soviet Union